The following is a timeline of the history of Topeka, Kansas, USA.

19th century
 1854 - Topeka Association organized.
 1855
 Constitution Hall built.
 Topeka Constitutional Convention held.
 1856
 Free-state government installed in Topeka, March 1856.
 1857
 Topeka incorporated.
 State Library of Kansas established.
 1859
 Kansas State Record newspaper begins publication.
 Atchison, Topeka and Santa Fe Railway chartered and set up offices and work shops.
 Wyandotte Constitution makes Topeka the temporary state capital.
 Topeka Cemetery established.
 1860
 Grace Church incorporated.
 Drought.
 Population: 759.
 1861
 Wyandotte Constitution  designates Topeka as state capitol.
 Kansas legislature convenes.
 Episcopal Female Seminary of Topeka chartered.
 1863 - Kansas Farmer begins publication.
 1864
 Topeka threatened during Price's Raid.
 Fort Simple built in the fall in to defend against Confederate troops during Price's Raid.
 1865
 Lincoln College founded.
 Harrison School built.
 Union Pacific railway begins operating in Eugene.
 1867 - Fort Simple torn down in April.
 1868 - Atchison, Topeka & Santa Fe railroad construction begins.
 1870
 Topeka & Shawnee County Public Library established.
 Population: 5,790.
 1871 - Topeka High School established.
 1872 - Topeka State Hospital opens.
 1873 - Kansas Academy of Science incorporated.
 1875 - Kansas Historical Society founded.
 1878 -  Topeka Harvey House opens.
 1879 - Daily Capital newspaper begins publication.
 1880 - Population: 15,452.
 1881 - Chartered as a city.
 1883 - Public Library building constructed.
 1886 - Population: 25,005.
 1887
 Governor's Mansion built.
 Topeka Golden Giants baseball team formed.
 1890 - Population: 31,007.
 1894 - Christ's Hospital established.
 1895 - Topeka Industrial and Educational Institute and Stormont Hospital and Training School established.
 1897 - Topeka Tent and Awning Company established.
 1899 - Gage Park established.

20th century
 1900
 Bethel Bible College founded.
 Population: 33,608.
 1902 - Smith Automobile Company founded.
 1903 - Kansas State Capitol building constructed.
 1905 - Topeka Industrial Institute later rebuilt as a women's prison.
 1906 - Bethesda Hospital established.
 1909 - St. Francis Hospital established.
 1910 - Population: 43,684.
 1911 - Hayden High School established.
 1914 - G.A.R. Memorial Hall built.
 1917 - Grace Episcopal Cathedral built.
 1920 - Menninger Clinic opens.
 1926 - Jayhawk Theatre opens.
 1928 - College of the Sisters of Bethany closed.
 1933 - Topeka Zoo opens.
 1936 - Sumner Elementary School built.
 1941 - Topeka Army Air Field established.
 1948 - Topeka station established.
 1950
 Population: 78,791.
 Railroad station built.
 1952 - Topeka Lutheran School opens.
 1954 - Brown v. Board of Education decided.
 1955 - Westboro Baptist Church opens.
 1962 - Cedar Crest (mansion) becomes state governor's official residence.
 1965 - Topeka Genealogical Society founded.
 1966 - Tornado.
 1976 - Forbes Field (airport) in operation.
 1980 - Cair Paravel-Latin School founded.
 1984 - Kansas Museum of History opens.
 1987 - Sunflower State Expo arena opens.
 1988 - West Ridge Mall opens.
 1989 - Heartland Park Topeka motorsports facility opens.
 1991 - Topeka Performing Arts Center opens.
 1997 - City website online (approximate date).
 1998 - Topeka ScareCrows ice hockey team founded.

21st century

2000s
 2003 - Kansas Koyotes football team formed.
 2004
 Brown v. Board of Education National Historic Site opens.
 Topeka RoadRunners ice hockey team founded.
 2005
 Bill Bunten becomes mayor.
 Topeka Golden Giants baseball team formed.
 2006 - Railroad station built.
 2008 - North Topeka Arts District formed.
 2009 - Topeka Mudcats women's football team founded.

2010s
 2010
 Kaw River State Park opens.
 Population: 127,473.

See also
 List of mayors of Topeka
 National Register of Historic Places listings in Shawnee County, Kansas
 Timeline of Kansas

other cities in Kansas
 Timeline of Wichita, Kansas

References

Bibliography

 
 1872
 
 
 1882
 1886
 
 
 
 
 
 
 
 1921
 
 
 
 

 
 Andrews, B. (1995). Topeka: A City of Opportunity (Kansas State Historical Society).
 Cohen, J. (2007). The History of Topeka ( University of Kansas Press).
 Holmes, J. (2020). Topeka: A History (Arcadia Publishing).
 Johnson, C. (1987). A History of Topeka (Kansas State University Press).
 Johnson, W. (1982). Topeka: An Illustrated History. Kansas State Historical Society).
 Kappler, P. (2010). Topeka: The History of a Capital City (Kansas State Historical Society).
 Price, T. (2012). Topeka: The Story of Kansas’ Capital City (University Press of Kansas).
 Smith, M. (2005). Topeka: An Illustrated History (Kansas Historical Society).
 White, J. (2003). Topeka: A History'' (Kansas Heritage Press).

External links

 
 Items related to Topeka, Kansas, various dates (via Digital Public Library of America).

Topeka, Kansas
Topeka
Topeka
Years in Kansas